Clyde railway station is located on the Main Suburban line, serving the Sydney suburb of Clyde. It is served by Sydney Trains T1 Western and T2 Inner West & Leppington line services.

History
Clyde station opened in 1882 as Rosehill Junction. It was renamed Clyde on 19 August 1883, Clyde Junction on 1 August 1901, and back to Clyde in April 1904.
The station was also rebuilt in 1959.

On 17 November 1888, Clyde became a Junction station with the opening of the Carlingford line to Rosehill. As part of the Parramatta Light Rail project, the Carlingford line closed on 5 January 2020.

Platforms & services

Transport links
Clyde station is served by two Nightride routes:
N60: Fairfield station to City (Town Hall)
N61: Carlingford station to Town Hall station

Trackplan

References

External links

Clyde station details Transport for New South Wales

Railway stations in Sydney
Railway stations in Australia opened in 1882
Main Suburban railway line
City of Parramatta